The Strathclyde Business School (SBS) is one of four faculties forming the University of Strathclyde in Glasgow, Scotland. Founded in 1948, the school is located on Cathedral Street within the John Anderson campus of the university. It offers courses for business education and management development.

Strathclyde Business School has around 200 academic staff and more than 4500 students (1960 undergraduate and 2615 postgraduate), with 11 subject departments and specialist units providing more specialist and cross-disciplinary postgraduate courses. It has been granted Triple Accreditation.

Strathclyde is the first triple accredited business school in Scotland. In November 2016, it was awarded THE Business School of the Year in UK. The Economist and Financial Times ranked the Strathclyde Business School's Master of Business Administration (MBA) 76th and 63rd worldwide in 2016, while its Executive MBA and Master's program in Finance was ranked 41st and 33rd worldwide by Financial Times in 2016. The school has international centres in six countries: Switzerland, Greece, Singapore, UAE, Oman, and Malaysia

Academic departments

There are six academic departments within the school:

 Accounting and Finance
 Economics
 Hunter Centre for Entrepreneurship
 Management Science
 Marketing
 Work, Employment and Organisation

Each department offers postgraduate, undergraduate and research programmes. The business school also offers faculty-wide programmes, both research and taught – the Master of Business Administration (MBA), Executive Masters in Hospitality and Tourism Leadership, the Doctor of Business Administration (DBA), and Research Methodology in Business & Management.

The business school has several research units:

 Strathclyde Institute for Operations Management (a joint venture between staff from SBS and the Faculty of Engineering);
 Fraser of Allander Institute (located in the Department of Economics but operating in a cross-disciplinary manner);
 Centre for Financial Regulation and Innovation
 Scottish Employment Research Centre (located in the Department of Work, Employment and Organisation)
 Informed Decision Analytics (IDeA) (located in the Department of Management Science)

International centres
In October 1988 the school launched its first Master of Business Administration centre abroad, in Singapore; a second centre opened in Hong Kong in April 1989. SBS was criticized for discrimination against Indian students.  the school has eight international centres across seven countries: Switzerland, Greece, Singapore, Oman, and Malaysia, Abu Dhabi and Dubai.

Recognition

Quality Accreditations
Strathclyde is the first triple accredited business school in Scotland, one of a small percentage worldwide to be triple accredited, holding accreditation from the international bodies, AMBA, AACSB and EQUIS.

CFA Institute University Recognition Programme
Strathclyde Business School offers several postgraduate programmes recognised by the CFA Institute for including a significant portion of the CFA Program Candidate Body of Knowledge (CBOK) and the Code of Ethics and Standards of Professional Conduct. The programmes recognised are the MSc Finance, MSc International Accounting and Finance, MSc Investment and Finance and the MSc International Banking and Finance.

Research Excellence Framework
In the 2014 Research Excellence Framework, Strathclyde Business School was rated in the top 10 in the UK for its research, number one in Scotland on GPA, 3rd in the UK for the impact of their research and achieved the highest possible rating for their research environment.

There are also a number of discipline-specific accreditations held by departments:

 Accounting is fully accredited for entry to the Institute of Chartered Accountants of Scotland (ICAS) as well as offering exemptions to other professional bodies, e.g. Association of Chartered Certified Accountants (ACCA) and Chartered Institute of Management Accountants (CIMA)
 The Department of Accounting and Finance has all five of its MSc programmes accredited by the Chartered Institute of Management Accountants (CIMA)
 Strathclyde MSc EMP is the first programme to be formally Recommended by the UK Government Economic Service
 The Department of Marketing is accredited by The Institute of Export, the Market Research Society, the Chartered Institute of Marketing
 CIPD is the professional association for HR professionals in the UK, with a membership of around 150,000. The Department of Human Resource Management is recognised by the Chartered Institute of Personnel and Development (CIPD)
 The Strathclyde MBA is accredited by the UAE government
The Strathclyde Business School is the first in the UK that offers a cluster for Financial Technology (FinTech) hosted by the top ranked Department of Accounting & Finance and enhanced with Input from the Computer Science Department 
The Strathclyde Technology and Innovation Centre plays a leading global role in developing fintech skills and innovation

Times Higher Education Awards

University of the Year 2019
In November 2019 the university was awarded with the Times Higher Education Awards and won the UK's University of the Year award for the second time as the first University ever. The jury emphasized on the vital social mission and the extremely high innovation power which is shown among other things in the development of Scotland's first innovation district, bringing researchers together with (financial) technology and creative start-ups, and also in the institution's approach to policy engagement.

Business School of the Year 2016
In November 2016, Strathclyde Business School was awarded THE Business School of the Year in the Times Higher Education Awards.

University of the Year 2012
In November 2012 the university was shortlisted for 4 categories in the Times Higher Education Awards and won the UK's University of the Year award.

UK Entrepreneurial University of the Year 2013
In the Times Higher Education 2013 Awards, the university won the "UK Entrepreneurial University of the Year 2013" award, making Strathclyde the first Scottish university to hold the title.

Notable alumni

 Nigel Cumberland, Leadership Coach and Author, including of 100 Things Successful People Do
 John Francis McFall, PC and Senior Deputy Speaker of the House of Lords
 Alastair Johnston, Co-Chief Executive Officer of IMG, the world's premier sports marketing firm
 Rajiv Mehrishi, IAS, former Home Secretary and Finance Secretary of India.
 James McColl, Chairman and Chief Executive of Clyde Blowers Ltd
 Sir Tom Hunter, CEO of Sports Division
 Alastair Storey, chairman and CEO of Westbury Street Holdings
 John Barton, British businessman, the chairman of Next plc and EasyJet
 Duncan Hawthorne, CEO of Horizon Nuclear Power
 Nigel Clifford, CEO of Ordnance Survey, a British government-owned mapping business
 Hugh Hendry, CEO of Eclectica Asset Management
 Inderjit Singh, former COO of Texas Instruments, and politician in Singapore's parliament
 Jacqueline Anne Lait, British Conservative Party politician
 Gustavo Alfredo Leite Gusinky, Minister of Industry and Commerce of Paraguay
 David Mundell, UK Government Minister, serving as Secretary of State for Scotland since 2015

References

External links
School website
Strathclyde University homepage

University of Strathclyde
Business schools in Scotland